Mollidgewock State Park is a  park in Errol, New Hampshire, on the Androscoggin River along Route 16 within Thirteen Mile Woods Scenic Area. Activities include camping, canoeing, fishing, hiking, wildlife watching, and picnicking. The campground offers 44 tent sites, 42 at the base camp and two at remote sites. There are picnic tables by the river.

The park is 1 of 10 New Hampshire state parks that are in the path of totality for the 2024 solar eclipse, with 2 minutes of totality.

References

External links
Mollidgewock State Park New Hampshire Department of Natural and Cultural Resources

State parks of New Hampshire
Parks in Coös County, New Hampshire
Errol, New Hampshire
Protected areas established in 1994
1994 establishments in New Hampshire